David M. Omdahl (born September 11, 1956) is an American politician and a former Republican member of the South Dakota Senate representing District 11 from 2013 to 2017.

Elections

South Dakota state senate
2012 When incumbent Senate District 11 Republican Senator Todd Schlekeway left the Legislature and left the seat open, Omdahl was unopposed for the June 5, 2012 Republican Primary and won the November 6, 2012 General election with 5,888 votes (56.7%) against Democratic nominee Tom Cool, who had been the Democratic nominee for the seat in 2010.

References

External links
Official page at the South Dakota Legislature
 

Place of birth missing (living people)
Living people
Politicians from Sioux Falls, South Dakota
Republican Party South Dakota state senators
1956 births